The Play is a Japanese art collective founded in 1967 and based in Kansai. In 2016, the National Museum of Art, Osaka dedicated a retrospective to their work.

Bibliography

References 

Japanese artist groups and collectives